

Bumpkin Island, also known as Round Island, Bomkin Island, Bumkin Island, or Ward's Island,  is an island in the Hingham Bay area of the Boston Harbor. In 1902, Albert Burrage, a Boston philanthropist, had a summer hospital opened on the island for children with physical disabilities. During World War I the island was used by the U.S. Navy. Starting around 1940, the island was used as a facility for polio patients. However, the hospital closed during World War II and burned down in 1945. Since 1996, it is part of the Boston Harbor Islands National Recreation Area. A sand spit, exposed at low tide, connects the eastern end of the island to Sunset Point in Hull.

On weekends and summer weekdays, Bumpkin Island is accessible by a shuttle boat to and from Georges Island, which connects from there with ferries to Boston and Quincy.

References

External links 

 Bumpkin Island web page, with visitor information.
 Bumpkin Island Art Encampment

Boston Harbor islands
Hingham, Massachusetts
Tidal islands of the United States
Islands of Plymouth County, Massachusetts
Coastal islands of Massachusetts